Clive Thompson (born 30 October 1968) is a Canadian freelance journalist, blogger, and science and technology writer.

Early life and education
Thompson grew up in the 1970s and the 1980s in Toronto, Canada. He spent his childhood working with early models of computers. He tried to understand programs for games and for artificial intelligence as a child but did not succeed, so he chose not to study science.
Thompson graduated from the University of Toronto with majors in political science and English in 1992. He previously worked for Canada's Report on Business magazine, This Magazine, and Shift magazine, then became a freelance contributor for The New York Times Magazine, The Washington Post, Lingua Franca, Wired, Shift, Entertainment Weekly and several other publications.

Professional work

Thompson writes about digital technologies and their social and cultural impact for a number of publications, including the New York Times Magazine and Wired.
Thompson originally wrote about the emergence of technology, much like Nicholas Carr, another author on the subject. However, Thompson now describes the "global self-expression" afforded to humanity by new forms of media. He writes about how tools affect how we think, but states that there are benefits from social thinking on internet. Thompson developed the idea of "ambient awareness," or the connections humans develop with each other through quick status updates throughout the day that ultimately end up being deep, intellectual and still social. He does acknowledge that ambient contact has caused the world to become too focused on the present. For Thompson, the internet is text that one can use to talk, argue, insult and compliment others with. Thompson stated in an interview that the internet will never replace cities because cities are too dynamic to replicate through technology. Thompson also states that cities and technology are connected because both are a way to foster connections. He writes that humanity is not yet overwhelmed by technology, and that humans have always faced new challenges with technology.
Thompson's blog, Collision Detection, started in 2002 and attracts over 3000 hits a day.

Awards and accolades
In 2002, he was awarded a Knight Science Journalism Fellowship at MIT.

Personal life
Thompson is married to The New Yorker TV critic Emily Nussbaum. They live in Brooklyn, New York, with their two children. Thompson plays guitar and harmonica in a band called The DeLorean Sisters. Thompson also wrote music for the duo Cove.

Bibliography

References

External links
 

Living people
Canadian bloggers
Canadian expatriate journalists in the United States
Wired (magazine) people
The New York Times writers
1968 births
University of Toronto alumni
Technology writers
Technology journalists